Yeshaya Steiner (known as Reb Shaya'la of Kerestir (Kerestirer)) (1851 – 27 April 1925), was a Rebbe in the town of Bodrogkeresztúr (Kerestir) near Miskolc in Hungary.

Biography 
Rabbi Yeshaya Steiner was born in 1851 to Rabbi Moshe and Hentsha Miriam Steiner in the village of Zborov near Bardeyov (today in Slovakia). When he was 3 years old, his father died. At the age of 12, his mother sent him to study in Hungary with Rabbi Tzvi Hirsh of Liska the author of Ach Pri Tevua, who later appointed him as his aide (Gabbai). When Tzvi Hirsh died and his son-in-law Rabbi Chaim Friedlander author of Tal Chaim succeeded him, Steiner started travelling to Rabbi Chaim Halberstam of Sanz. After the death of Rabbi Chaim of Sanz, he became a disciple of Rabbi Mordechai Leifer. Rabbi Mordechai Leifer suggested that he move to the town of Bodrogkeresztúr (Kerestir), in Hungary.

In Bodrogkeresztúr, Steiner became a Hasidic Rebbe and became known as a miracle worker, and tens of thousands of Hasidim came to his court.

He was known as hospitable on an institutional scale. In recent years, hospitality projects have developed in his town of Bodrogkeresztúr.

Steiner's image is used as an amulet by those Jews who believe that it wards away mice and offers protection against misinformation.

His children were: Rabbi Avraham; Kreintsheh wife of Rabbi Shmuel Gross Rabbi of Krula; Rivka Feiga, wife of Rabbi Reuven Chaim Klein, Rabbi of Snina; and Rachel the wife of Rabbi Yisrael Avraham Alter Landa Rabbi of Edelin and author of Beith Yisrael. In 1925 he was succeeded by his son Avraham.

Descendants 
 Rabbi Yissachar Dov Rubin, Grand Rabbi of Kerestir in Borough Park, Brooklyn
 Rabbi Naftali Grosz (1901–1987) Grand Rabbi of Kerestir-Berbesht, Son-in-Law of Rabbi Avraham Steiner. Brooklyn New York, Israel, Miami Beach. After Grosz died in 1988, his son, Rabbi Rafael Grosz, (also known as Rabbi Armin Grosz), became the new Kerestir Rebbe in Miami Beach. 
 Rabbi Yeshaya Gross, eldest son of Rabbi Naftali Grosz, of Williamsburg, Brooklyn – Grand Rabbi of Kerestir-Berbesht, Brooklyn NY, Desert Hot Springs California.

Kerestir Dynasty 
 Rebbe Yeshayah Steiner (1852–1925)
 Rebbe Avrohom Steiner (1883–1927), son of Rebbe Yeshaya (Rebbe from 1925 to 1927)
 Rabbi Shmuel Gross, son-in-law of Rebbe Yeshaya
 Rabbi Reuven Chaim Klein, son-in-law of Rebbe Yeshaya
 Rabbi Yisroel Avrohom Alter Landa, son-in-law of Rebbe Yeshaya
 Rebbe Meir Yosef Rubin of Kerestir, son-in-law of Rebbe Avrohom
 Rebbe Naftoli Gross of Debrecen (died 1988), brother of Rabbi Yeshaya's son-in-law Rabbi Shmuel and son-in-law of Rebbe Avrohom
 Rebbe Rafael Gross (1928–2007) – Kerestir Rebbe of Miami Beach, Florida, son of Rebbe Naftoli
 Rebbe Chananyah Gross – Kerestir Rebbe of Woodridge, NY, son of Rebbe Rafael
 Rebbe Yeshaya Grosz – (died on 2nd AdarI 5776) Kerestir-Berbesht Rebbe of Williamsburg, Brooklyn, NY, son of Rebbe Naftoli
 Rabbi Reuven Grosz (the former Rabbi of Karlsbad, disciple and adopted ben bayis of Rabbi Yeshaya Grosz) – Brachfeld, E. Israel
 Rabbi Yoishua Moishe Baruch of Woodmere, son of Rebbe Naftali
 Rebbi Alter Krausz – present Kerestir Rebbe in Monsey, NY, USA.
Rabbi Shmuel David Krausz, grandchild of Rabbi Yisroel Avrohom.
Rabbi Mayer Yosef Rubin, son of Rabbi Mendel Monroe, NY, USA Rabbi in Kerestir Since 1991

References

External links 
 Pictures of the grave and more on Kosher Trip Adviser Website 
 FindLaw case on religious freedom

Further reading 
 

Hasidic rebbes
1851 births
1925 deaths
Hungarian Hasidic rabbis
Jewish Hungarian history